Sergey Ignatyev may refer to:
Sergei Ignatyev (boxer), Russian boxer who participated in the 2008 Boxing World Cup
Sergey Mikhaylovich Ignatyev (born 1948), Russian economist, banker and official
Sergei Vladimirovich Ignatyev (born 1986), Russian footballer
Sergey Ignatiev (politician) (1902–1984), a Soviet politician
Sergey Yurievich Ignatyev (born 1958), Uzbek artist and human rights defender